Mustafa Kaya (born June 6, 1992) is a Turkish retired freestyle wrestler. He competed in the men's freestyle 65 kg event at the 2016 Summer Olympics, in which he was eliminated in the round of 32 by Alejandro Valdés.

References

External links
 

1992 births
Living people
Turkish male sport wrestlers
Olympic wrestlers of Turkey
Wrestlers at the 2016 Summer Olympics
Mediterranean Games gold medalists for Turkey
Mediterranean Games medalists in wrestling
Competitors at the 2013 Mediterranean Games
European Games medalists in wrestling
European Games bronze medalists for Turkey
European Wrestling Championships medalists
Wrestlers at the 2015 European Games
20th-century Turkish people
21st-century Turkish people